Ethmia paucella is a moth in the family Depressariidae. It is found in the Dominican Republic and Haiti.

The forewings have markings which are more or less evenly spaced and similar sized roundish spots of black reflecting metallic blue. The ground color of the hindwings is pale ocherous, except the costal area which is entirely clothed with bright ocherous, roughened scaling from the upper margin of the cell to the costal margin. Adults are on wing in June.

References

Moths described in 1914
paucella